Carlos Olaf Heredia Orozco (born 19 October 1957) is a Mexican former professional football goalkeeper who played for Mexico in the 1986 FIFA World Cup. He also played for Tigres UANL.

Career
Born in Apatzingán, Heredia was the fifth of seven children and devoted himself to football. He began playing football with UNAM Pumas and made his Mexican Primera División debut against Atlético Potosino in 1978. Heredia would play six seasons with Pumas, and won the 1980–81 Primera title with the club.

After leaving Pumas, Heredia had spells with Tigres UANL, Monarcas Morelia, Cruz Azul and Santos Laguna. Before he retired, he won a second Primera title with Santos in 1996.

After he finished playing football, Heredia became a goalkeeping coach for Pumas.
On 2012 he was appointed new Chivas GK coach.

References

External links
FIFA profile

1957 births
Living people
People from Apatzingán
Footballers from Michoacán
Mexican footballers
Mexico international footballers
1986 FIFA World Cup players
Association football goalkeepers
Club Universidad Nacional footballers
Tigres UANL footballers
Atlético Morelia players
Cruz Azul footballers
Santos Laguna footballers
Liga MX players
Querétaro F.C. non-playing staff
Atlante F.C. non-playing staff